Carol Dewey is an American volleyball coach. She became the first head coach of Purdue University's women's volleyball team in 1975. She retired in 1994. After retiring as a head coach, Dewey worked as a compliance and academic officer.

Early life
Dewey is from Brecksville, Ohio. In 1967, she graduated from Muskingum College.

Career

Playing
As a player, she was on the 1975 U.S. National Team. Dewey was also a part of the E. Pluribus Unum team in 1972 and 1973, winning national championships both years.

Coaching
Dewey coached at Purdue University for 20 years, from 1975 to 1994. The program became the first women's revenue sport at Purdue University.

Under Dewey, Purdue's team produced five All-Americans, six Academic All-Americans, and 39 players that received the All-Big Ten award. She also coached three teams that won Big Ten titles, in 1980, 1982, and 1985.

In her ninth season as Purdue's head coach, Dewey led Purdue to an undefeated regular season. They finished the season ranked eighth in the country.

Dewey remained with Purdue after retiring from coaching, working as a compliance and academic officer from 1995 to 2000. She retired with an overall record of 469–256, a Purdue record for wins for a single sport coach.

Accomplishments

Dewey was inducted into the Purdue Intercollegiate Athletics Hall of Fame in 2003. In 2005, she was inducted into the American Volleyball Coaches Association Hall of Fame.

She received the Bertha Lucas All-Time Great Coach Award from USA Volleyball. Dewey was a three-time Big Ten Coach of the Year, achieving the honor in 1982, 1985, and 1987.

Head coaching record

References

Volleyball coaches
Year of birth missing (living people)
Living people
People from Brecksville, Ohio
Purdue Boilermakers women's volleyball coaches